Birch Ridge is a Canadian community located in Kent County, New Brunswick. The community is situated in southeastern New Brunswick, to the northwest of Moncton.

History

Notable people

See also
List of communities in New Brunswick

References

Bordering communities
Hebert, New Brunswick
Coal Branch, New Brunswick

Communities in Kent County, New Brunswick